Shams ad-Din Orabi was a Libyan politician. He was a foreign minister of the Kingdom of Libya (September 1968-June 1969).
Libya ambassador for Italy, Egypt, Algeria.  
Brother of Asad Bin Omran, founder of the Omar al-Mukhtar foundation.  
He died in London on May 5, 2009.

Notes

Foreign ministers of Libya
Year of birth missing
2009 deaths
Ambassadors of Libya to Algeria
Ambassadors of Libya to Egypt
Ambassadors of Libya to Italy